Anhonee is a 1973 Bollywood suspense drama film directed by Ravi Tandon. It stars Sanjeev Kumar, Leena Chandavarkar, Bindu, Padma Khanna and Kamini Kaushal. Laxmikant-Pyarelal provided the music for the film. Year 1996 movie Chhote Sarkar was partially inspired by this film. This is considered one of the best crime thriller film made in Bollywood.

Plot

After the tragic death of her dad, Dr. Rekha continues to live with her step-mother in Bombay, where she runs a mental institution. While traveling by train one night, they are accosted by a knife-wielding escaped mental patient, Sunil, whose aggression is calmed by Rekha. She gets him admitted into her hospital where he is put under observation and treatment at the hands of Dr. Mathur and herself. He soon starts responding positively under their care, and is on his way to recovery. Once, he saves Rekha from being molested in a parking lot, and this sparks romance between the two. At first Rekha is reluctant to marry Sunil due to a secret which she cannot reveal. After great persistence from Sunil, she reveals that she killed her father by accident when he was trying to have sex with her thinking that she was her stepmother. But she still doesn't understand why didn't he stop when she shrieked out after identifying her voice ; she probably thinks that as he was drunk he might have had the difficulty. It is then revealed that Sunil is not as he pretends to be; He is a well respected Police Inspector trying to find the mystery of Mr.Rai Bahadur's death. All is set for the two to get engaged at a lavish party. It is at this party that Rekha will find out that Sunil who he is and tries to get away from him.

Cast
Sanjeev Kumar as CID Inspector Sunil
Leena Chandavarkar as Dr. Rekha
Padma Khanna as Roopa
Bindu as Rita
Rehman as Inspector General
Manmohan as Dr. Mathur
Paintal as Dr. Tripathi
Asrani as Gangaram
Jankidas as Girdharilal
Kamini Kaushal as Mrs. Rai Bahadur Singh
Satyendra Kapoor as Diwan
Mac Mohan as Peter
Sudhir as Tiger
M. B. Shetty as Henchman
Anwar Hussain as Police Commissioner
 Ranveer Raj as Dr.Shukla
 Polson as Passenger in red car
 Shashi Kiran as Passenger in red car
 Anoop Kumar as Inmate
 Lalita Kumari as Mrs.Darayani

Music
Laxmikant-Pyarelal composed the songs on lyrics by Verma Malik.

Awards and nominations

Asha Bhosale was nominated for Filmfare award for Best female playback singer.

|-
| 1973
| Asrani
| Shama Sushama Award for Best Comedian
| 
|}

External links
 
 

1973 films
1970s Hindi-language films
1973 drama films
Films scored by Laxmikant–Pyarelal
Films directed by Ravi Tandon
Indian crime thriller films
Indian crime drama films